Batteries Not Included (stylized as *batteries not included) is a 1987 American science fiction comedy film directed by Matthew Robbins about small extraterrestrial living spaceships that save an apartment block under threat from property development. The story was originally intended to be featured in the television series Amazing Stories, but executive producer Steven Spielberg liked the idea so much that he decided to adapt it into a film. It was the feature film screenwriting debut of Brad Bird.

Plot
Frank and Faye Riley, an elderly couple who manage an apartment building and café in the East Village, come under threat by a nearby property development. The development manager, Lacey, sends a hoodlum named Carlos and his gang of thugs to bribe the couple and their tenants to move out. When the tenants resist, Carlos and his thugs punch through artist Mason Baylor's door, intimidate pregnant single mother Marisa Esteval, and break retired boxer Harry Noble's jar of tiles. After Frank Riley refuses to move, Carlos vandalizes the café.

This assault convinces three of the tenants to move out. Mason's girlfriend, Pamela is tired of living in an old, depressing building with a guy whose art career is going nowhere. She dumps Mason, packs up and before leaving, advises Mason to quit being an artist and get a steady job. The Rileys' friends, Muriel and Sid Hogensin, take Lacey's bribe and decide to move to a retirement home in New Jersey. Frank feels a little betrayed by the Hogensins for taking Lacey's money but they explain that the building doesn't feel like home anymore. They advise Frank that maybe he and Faye should come live with them at the retirement home. With the assault and Faye's dementia growing, Frank contemplates giving in.

Things look bleak until a pair of small living spaceships appear in the Rileys' apartment that evening and start repairing many of the items that were broken. They also repair the vandalized cafe, putting Frank and Faye back in business. The two aliens take up residence in the shed at the top of the apartment building and are dubbed "The Fix-Its" by the residents. Carlos comes back to threaten the tenants once again, but the Fix-Its lure him to the top of the building and into the shed where they scare him away.

Faye and Marisa learn that the "female" Fix-It is pregnant. After consuming plenty of metal and electrical objects, it gives birth to three baby Fix-Its, although one of them is stillborn. Faye buries the stillborn in a flowerbox the next day, but then Harry digs it up, takes it back to his apartment, and succeeds in reviving it by taking apart his precious television set. Frank and Faye see a boost of business in the café from the demolition crew, while the Fix-Its help in the kitchen.

Mason and Marisa grow closer. Marisa admires Mason's paintings, which makes Mason feel better about his art. Marisa's baby is due in 2 to 3 months. Her boyfriend, Hector, who is a musician and the father of her baby, comes over. Mason leaves Marisa and Hector alone, but when Mason returns, Hector is gone. Marisa explains that Hector and his band have found a steady gig in Chicago with good pay. Mason wonders why Hector would leave without her. Marisa confesses that she told Hector to go without her because their relationship just wasn't working out. But it also appears she has developed feelings for Mason. Mason has developed feelings for her as well.

With Carlos unable to prove the existence of the Fix-Its that had been foiling their plans, Lacey is furious with the delays in evicting the tenants and moves to replace him. Desperate to see the job done and growing more unstable, Carlos breaks into the building's basement to sabotage the building's pipework and electricity, and badly damages the "father" machine in the process. After Harry throws him out, the tenants discover the Fix-It children are missing and go searching for them in the city while Faye stays behind with the "mother" machine as it fixes the "father". When the "father" machine is repaired, the now-wary Fix-It parents leave to seek out their offspring. After finding them with Harry, the machine family departs from the planet.

Tired of the delays, Lacey hires an arsonist. The arsonist attempts to burn down the building in a staged "accidental fire". Carlos discovers the plan and, in a rage, sabotages the arson to make the entire building explode, only to then discover that Faye is still in the building. While the arsonist flees, Carlos unsuccessfully attempts to pose as her late son Bobby to get her to leave, but succeeds in rescuing her as the fire spreads. The tenants then return to find the blazing apartment block collapsing, and Faye being loaded into an ambulance.

By the next morning, the apartment block has been reduced to a smoldering wreck. To Kovacs' fury the construction crew, out of respect for Harry, refuse to continue as he is sitting dejected on the steps. Harry is greeted by the mechanical family later that night, who have recruited countless other Fix-Its for repairs. By the next morning, the entire building has been seamlessly restored to brand new condition, ending Lacey's demolition plans and resulting in him terminating Kovacs. Mason and Marisa settle into a relationship while Carlos tries to start a friendship with the Rileys, with Faye finally having come to accept her real son's passing.

Some years later, the developments have been built, but this time flanking either side of the tiny apartment building, with Frank's café now doing a roaring trade as a result of the new employment brought into the area.

Cast

Production

Principal photography started in New York in August 1986, but location scouting began almost a year before. "Since the story called for a solitary building amidst rubble," explained producer Ronald Schwary, "we had to find a vacant lot with burned-out buildings all around it. We finally settled on an actual building on 8th Street between Avenues C and D on New York's Lower East Side (the building no longer stands, and was probably located on the site of the current Housing Bureau substation, or the building to the east. ).  Production designer Ted Haworth designed a three-sided, four-story tenement facade and oversaw its construction on a location that covered most of a city block. In the name of authenticity, he brought 50 to 60 truckloads of rubble to cover the one vacant lot. It was so remarkably realistic that the Sanitation Department came by and took away prop garbage one morning, potential customers stopped by to eat in the diner, and the business agent for the Plumber's Local of New York visited, demanding to know why there wasn't a permit down at City Hall for the construction."

Reception
The movie gained a mostly mixed reception but debuted at #4 at the box office. It has a rating of 67% on Rotten Tomatoes based on 18 reviews. Gene Siskel described it as "a comic book with the best pages torn out" and accused the film of having "forced warmth." Roger Ebert defended the film, saying it "had a lot of good feeling in it, it had a few nice laughs, it had a few interesting special effects, and...it's better than most of the stuff out there."

See also
 Self-replicating machine
 List of films featuring extraterrestrials

References

External links
 
 
 
 

1987 films
1980s children's comedy films
1980s science fiction comedy films
1980s fantasy comedy films
American children's fantasy films
American science fiction comedy films
American fantasy comedy films
American robot films
1980s English-language films
Films about extraterrestrial life
Films about real estate holdout
Films set in apartment buildings
Films using stop-motion animation
Puppet films
Films set in Manhattan
Films shot in New York City
Amblin Entertainment films
Universal Pictures films
Films directed by Matthew Robbins
Films scored by James Horner
Films with screenplays by Matthew Robbins
Films with screenplays by Mick Garris
Films with screenplays by Brad Bird
1987 comedy films
1980s American films